The Stygarctidae are a family of tardigrades. The family was first described by Schulz in 1951. The genus Neoarctus was first placed in the family Stygarctidae, but it was moved to a separate family, Neoarctidae, in 1998.

Subfamilies and genera
They are divided into the following subfamilies and genera:
Megastygarctidinae Bello & de Zio Grimaldi, 1998:
Megastygarctides McKirdy, Schmidt & McGinty-Bayly, 1976
Stygarctinae Schulz, 1951:
Faroestygarctus Hansen, Kristensen & Jørgensen, 2012
Mesostygarctus Renaud-Mornant, 1979
Parastygarctus Renaud-Debyser, 1965
Prostygarctus Rubal, Veiga, Fontoura & Sousa-Pinto, 2013
Pseudostygarctus McKirdy, Schmidt & McGinty-Bayly, 1976
Stygarctus Schulz, 1951

References

 
Tardigrade families